The Samsung GT-i8510 (marketed as the Samsung INNOV8) is a Symbian OS smartphone produced by Samsung Electronics, announced on 30 July 2008 and released in late 2008. The Innov8's functions include those of a camera phone and portable media player, including an 8-megapixel camera (which its name refers to) with Dual LED and Schneider-Kreuznach optics.

In addition to offering e-mail, web browsing, local Wi-Fi connectivity and text messaging, the Innov8 uses the S60 3rd Edition platform with Feature Pack 2, much like e.g. Nokia N85. The phone is available with either 8 GB or 16 GB internal memory and both feature a MicroSDHC memory card slot with support for cards up to 32 GB.

The Samsung Innov8 was critically acclaimed and is often considered one of the best Symbian devices of its time.

Features
Built-in GPS receiver
A-GPS function
3D Graphics PowerVR MBX Lite OpenGL ES 1.1
Business card scanner
DivX/H.263 / H.264 / WMV / MP4 player
MP3 / eAAC+ / WMA / AMR / RealAudio player
3.5 mm audio jack
TV out functionality
Java MIDP 2.1
FM radio with RDS
Organizer
Built-in handsfree,
Voice memo/dia
DLNA support

See also
Samsung M8800 Pixon
Samsung i900 Omnia
Samsung U900 Soul
Samsung G810
Nokia N96
Sony Ericsson C905
LG KF510
LG KC550

External links
 Review: http://www.gsmarena.com/samsung_i8510_innov8-review-302.php
Samsung innov8 Review Samsung innov8 Review

Notes

I8510|smartphones|GPS
Samsung smartphones
Symbian devices
Mobile phones introduced in 2008
Discontinued smartphones
Slider phones